"Bigger than Dynamite" is the only single released from Deacon Blue's compilation album Singles.

The B-sides are covers of Woody Guthrie's "Deportee Song" and the Rolling Stones' "Wild Horses", performed live.

Track listing 

CD single  (88697000822)

 "Bigger than Dynamite" – 3:25
 "Deportee Song (Live From Newport Centre, Newport, England, 24.11.01)" (Guthrie, Martin Hoffman) – 6:25
 "Wild Horses (Live From Newport Centre, Newport, England, 24.11.01)" (Richards, Jagger) – 5:30

Deacon Blue songs
2006 singles
2006 songs
Columbia Records singles
Songs written by Ricky Ross (musician)